Pavarotti Forever is a compilation album, released by the Italian tenor Luciano Pavarotti on 7 September 2007 in Europe and on 13 September 2007 in North America and the rest of the world. The release features nearly two and a half hours of music and is distributed by Decca Records. Pavarotti Forever reached the Top 10 in various countries and was well received  by many music critics.

Chart positions

Weekly charts

Year-end charts

Certifications

References

2007 albums
Luciano Pavarotti albums